American International may refer to:

American International Group, a Fortune 500 insurance company
American International Pictures, a defunct movie production company
 The American International Building, a skyscraper in New York City
 American International College of Springfield, Massachusetts